Heinrich Trumheller (born 1 July 1972) is a German former racing cyclist. He won the German National Road Race Championships in 1992.

Major results

1991
 1st Overall Okolo Slovenska
 1st Overall Bizkaiko Bira
1992
 1st  Road race, National Road Championships
 2nd Wartenberg Rundfahrt
 5th Coppa Placci
 6th Overall Tour de Suisse
 8th Overall Critérium International
 9th Giro di Romagna
1993
 3rd Monte Carlo–Alassio
 4th Overall Tour de l'Avenir
 6th Japan Cup Cycle Road Race
 7th Classique des Alpes
1994
 7th Overall Circuit Cycliste Sarthe
1997
 1st Stage 6 Tour du Loir-et-Cher
 1st Stage 5 Sachsen Tour
 3rd Rund um Düren
1998
 1st Internationale Ernst-Sachs-Tour
1999
 5th Rund um Düren
 10th Overall Rheinland-Pfalz Rundfahrt
2000
 1st Stage 3 Sachsen Tour
 9th GP de Villers-Cotterêts

References

External links
 

1972 births
Living people
German male cyclists
German cycling road race champions
Sportspeople from Nalchik
Russian people of Volga German descent
Cyclists from Baden-Württemberg
Soviet emigrants to Germany
People from Donaueschingen
Sportspeople from Freiburg (region)
Soviet male cyclists
20th-century German people